Codex of Munich (or Munich Codex) is a part of the oldest known Hungarian translation of the Bible, called Bible of Hussittes (or the Hussite Bible). It was written at Tatros (today Târgu Trotuș, Romania) in 1466. Today it is located in Munich at Bavarian State Library. (Cod. Hung. 1)

Content
The Codex of Munich contains the Hungarian translation of the four Gospels. At the recto of the 108th letter, at the end of Gospel of John, there is written who made the copy, where and when it was produced. As it is written, script was finished by György Németi, Son of Imre Henzsel. There is no  further mention about him.

Sources
MÜNCHENI-KÓDEX | Magyar Nyelvemlékek 
Müncheni-kódex – Magyar Katolikus Lexikon 
Müncheni-kódex - Lexikon :: - Kislexikon

External links 

 The text of the Munich Codex in its original orthographic form as well as its version normalized according to the Modern Hungarian spelling along with full morphological analysis is available in the Old Hungarian Corpus. 

Hungarian books
Hungarian chronicles
15th-century literature
Gothic art
Hungarian literature